The men's 20 kilometres walk at the 1981 Summer Universiade was held in Bucharest on 23 July 1981. It was the first time that racewalking was contested at the Universiade.

Results

References

Athletics at the 1981 Summer Universiade
1981